The Missing Head of Damasceno Monteiro is a 1997 crime novel by the Italian writer Antonio Tabucchi. It is set in Porto, Portugal, and follows a murder investigation after a headless body has been found.

Reception
Michael Pye of The New York Times called the novel "a vivid book" and wrote that Tabucchi "writes with all his senses". He noted how the book often reflects on subjects in ways conventional crime novels do not, and wrote: "Much of this works very well, but you should be warned about Tabucchi's tendency to slam the door on the captive reader and start a seminar. ... You may sometimes want to snort with exasperation and send Tabucchi's book skirling across the room. But, then again, when did you last find a novel this interesting?"

See also
 1997 in literature
 Italian literature

References

1997 novels
Italian crime novels
Novels by Antonio Tabucchi
Novels set in Portugal
20th-century Italian novels